The RugbyWA Fortescue Premier Grade was formed in 1928 and was the first consistent competition for Rugby Union in the state of Western Australia. It is the highest level of domestic club rugby played in Western Australia. It is competed annually form early April to mid August but with preseason training often starting before the season. The competition is managed by RugbyWA. The FMG Premier Grade was named for lead sponsor Fortescue Metals Group. Previous naming rights sponsors include PINDAN, KWIK and Home Building Society. The Premier Grade is contested by 13 teams from the Greater Perth Area. For the start of the 2022 season, RugbyWA have struck a television deal with Stan Sports, who broadcast one game per round.

Teams 

*"(year)" Denotes the last year they won the premiership.

Premiers

References

External links
 

Rugby union in Western Australia
Rugby union competitions in Australia
Sports competitions in Perth, Western Australia
1928 establishments in Australia
Sports organizations established in 1928